This was the first edition of the tournament since 2002. Venus Williams was the top seed, but lost in the semifinals to Olga Puchkova.
Monica Niculescu won the title, defeating Puchkova in three sets, 6–2, 4–6, 6–4.

Seeds

Draw

Finals

Top half

Bottom half

Qualifying

Seeds
The top three seeds received a bye into the qualifying competition.

Qualifiers

Draw

First qualifier

Second qualifier

Third qualifier

Fourth qualifier

Fifth qualifier

Sixth qualifier

References
Main Draw
Qualifying Draw

Brasil Tennis Cup - Singles
2013 Singles